Eliza Seymour Lee (1800–1874), was an American pastry chef and restaurateur. 

She was the daughter of the famous pastry chef Sally Seymour. In 1823, she married the free colored tailor John Lee (d. 1851). 

She inherited her mother's business and property, including a bakery and slave labor, in 1824, and expanded it to eventually managing four restaurants in Charleston, South Carolina: The Mansion House on Broad Street (1840–1845), Lee House (1845–1848), Ann Deas' Jones Hotel (1848–1850) and Moultrie House on Sullivan’s Island (1850–1851).  

She was one of the most successful businesswomen in Charleston alongside her rival Théonie Rivière Mignot.  As her mother before her, she was often hired to cater to the private functions hosted by the private societies of the Charleston planter aristocracy, most notably the annual banquet of the South Carolina Jockey Club during race week.  Her success was uncommon for a free coloured woman in Prewar South.  
She retired in 1861.

See also
 Aspasia Cruvellier Mirault

References

1874 deaths
1800 births
19th-century American businesswomen
19th-century American businesspeople
Pastry chefs
African-American businesspeople
American bakers
Black slave owners in the United States
American hoteliers
Free people of color
19th-century African-American women
Businesspeople from Charleston, South Carolina
American women slave owners
American slave owners